Krutets is a rural locality (a village) in Komyanskoye Rural Settlement, Gryazovetsky District, Vologda Oblast, Russia. The population was 17 as of 2002.

Geography 
Krutets is located 28 km northeast of Gryazovets (the district's administrative centre) by road. Yevsyukovo is the nearest rural locality.

References 

Rural localities in Gryazovetsky District